Cathay Life Insurance is a life insurance company in Taiwan founded in 1962.
The firm offers life, health, and annuities. In 2017, Cathay ranked 411th on the Fortune Global 500.

History 
The firm was founded in 1962 by Tsai Wan-lin and family members.

Cathay Life was the first Taiwanese life insurance company to enter the Chinese market, starting in Shanghai in 2005. The firm then entered Vietnam in 2008, forming Cathay Life Vietnam and selling through banks.

See also
 List of companies of Taiwan

References 

1962 establishments in Taiwan
Companies based in Taipei
Financial services companies established in 1962
Life insurance companies of Taiwan